The Fatal Witness is a 1945 American mystery film directed by Lesley Selander and written by Jerry Sackheim and Cleve F. Adams. The film stars Evelyn Ankers, Richard Fraser, George Leigh, Barbara Everest, Barry Bernard and Frederick Worlock. The film was released on September 15, 1945, by Republic Pictures.

Plot

The wealthy Lady Elizabeth Ferguson threatens to disinherit nephew John Bedford after accusing him of stealing from her. Bedford goes to a pub, where he becomes inebriated, creates a scene and is taken to jail.

The dead body of Lady Elizabeth is discovered by her ward, Priscilla Ames, who phones Scotland Yard. It doesn't take long for Inspector Trent to consider Bedford a suspect, but having been in a cell, Bedford's alibi is iron-clad.

A jail guard, Scoggins, was bribed to release Bedford for one hour on the night of the murder. When he demands more money, Bedford kills him, first establishing yet another alibi. A suspicious Trent manages to persuade Priscilla to try an elaborate ruse, hiring actress Vera Cavanaugh to pretend to be Lady Elizabeth's ghost. As everyone else in the room pretends to see nothing, a terrified Bedford confesses.

Cast
Evelyn Ankers as Priscilla Ames
Richard Fraser as Inspector William 'Bill' Trent
George Leigh as John Bedford
Barbara Everest as Lady Elizabeth Ferguson / Vera Cavanaugh
Barry Bernard as Scoggins
Frederick Worlock as Sir Humphrey Mong
Virginia Farmer as Martha
Colin Campbell as Sir Malcolm Hewitt
Crauford Kent as Jepson
Peggy Jackson as Gracie Hallet
Elaine Lange as Tillie 
Harry Cording as Gus
Boyd Irwin as Randall

References

External links 
 

1945 films
1940s English-language films
American mystery films
1945 mystery films
Republic Pictures films
Films directed by Lesley Selander
Films set in London
American black-and-white films
1940s American films